Esperanza is a comunidad in Puerto Real Barrio, on the south side of the island of Vieques, Puerto Rico. It was the location of Hacienda Casa del Frances, a historic site listed on the U.S. National Register of Historic Places.

Climate
Due to the town's location inside the tropics, its low elevation, and its position in the Caribbean Sea, Esperanza experiences a Tropical rainforest climate (Köppen Af). This results in a hot and wet climate throughout the year, with no significant change in temperature between seasons. Precipitation is spread evenly around the year, but the town experiences its greatest rainfall between the months of Aug-Nov.

Gallery

See also

 List of communities in Puerto Rico
 List of barrios and sectors of Vieques, Puerto Rico

References

External links
 http://www.buyzips.com/zip/Vieques/PR/00765/Vieques.htm Retrieved June 14, 2017.
 Census profile: Esperanza, PR Retrieved June 14, 2017.
 Basic Facts about Vieques, Puerto Rico

Vieques, Puerto Rico